St. Peter's Church, Headon-cum-Upton is a parish church in the Church of England in Headon, Nottinghamshire.

The church is Grade I listed by the Department for Digital, Culture, Media and Sport as a building of outstanding architectural or historic interest.

History

The church is medieval dating from the twelfth century, but much dates from the fourteenth century.

Stained glass

There are no stained glass windows

Parish structure
The church is in a group of parishes which includes
 St. Nicholas' Church, Askham
 St. Helen's Church, Grove
 Church of St. John the Baptist, East Markham
 St. Peter's Church, Headon-cum-Upton

References

12th-century church buildings in England
14th-century church buildings in England
Church of England church buildings in Nottinghamshire
Grade I listed churches in Nottinghamshire